Turloughmore is a village in County Galway, Ireland. The name means "the large lake," a notable feature of the area, together with the Clare River (Abhainn an Chláir). Turloughmore lies on the N63 national secondary road. 

It is a small village consisting of two petrol stations, three pubs and the base of a bus service company. Turloughmore was designated as a census town by the Central Statistics Office for the first time in the 2016 census, at which time it had a population of 240 people. 

The village was once known for the horse fair held there, and for the faction-fighting that occurred at the fair (see John Callaghan (Galway)). The village represents a long-established settlement with a medieval history, and is near the site of the Battle of Knockdoe (Irish Cath Chnoc Tua), a bloody conflict in 1504 between some of the most powerful magnates of the time.

See also
 List of towns and villages in Ireland

Sources

References

Towns and villages in County Galway